Cañacao Bay is a small bay located within the larger Manila Bay in Luzon island in the Philippines.

It is located along the northeastern end of the Cavite Peninsula and Cavite City, in the Province of Cavite.

The bay is a good anchorage and it is bordered to the north by the Danilo Atienza Air Base of the Philippine Air Force and by the Naval Base Cavite of the Philippine Navy to the south.  Both military bases previously were comprised by the Naval Station Sangley Point of the United States.

The Cavite City Hall is on the south side of the bay, with a pier for public ferry service to Metro Manila.

The shore of the bay near the former Cavite Royal Arsenal was where the province's patron saint, an icon known as Our Lady of Solitude of Porta Vaga, was found during the Spanish colonial period following a Marian apparition.

See also
Cavite City

References

Webster's New Geographical Dictionary. Springfield, Massachusetts: Merriam-Webster Inc., 1984.

Bays of the Philippines
Manila Bay
Cavite City
Landforms of Cavite